Oasis is a studio album by 1980s group Oasis (not the 1990s rock band of the same name). The album was recorded at Solid Bond Studios and Trident II Studios in London. It was mixed at Trident II Studios. The album peaked at No. 23 on the UK Albums Chart, staying there for 14 weeks.

Track listing

Side One
"Prelude" – 2.14 (Peter Skellern)
"If This Be the Last Time" – 4.18 (Peter Skellern)
"I Wonder Why" – 3.51 (music: Bill Lovelady / lyrics: Marita Phillips)
"Hold Me" – 4.10 (Peter Skellern)
"Oasis" – 5.39 (Peter Skellern)

Side Two
"Sirocco" – 6.17 (music: Bill Lovelady & Mitch Dalton / lyrics: Marita Phillips)
"Who Knows" – 4.55 (Peter Skellern)
"Weavers of Moonbeams" – 5.01 (Peter Skellern)
"Loved and Lost" – 5.13 (Peter Skellern)
"True Love" – 4.23 (Cole Porter)

Personnel
Peter Skellern – vocals, keyboards, synths
Mary Hopkin – vocals
Julian Lloyd Webber – cello
Bill Lovelady – guitar
Mitch Dalton – guitar
Andy Pask – bass
Charlie Morgan – drums
Tristan Fry – marimbas
Frank Ricotti – percussion

References 

1984 debut albums
Warner Music Group albums